"Run" is a song by Japanese singer-songwriter Joji. It was released on 6 February 2020 through 88rising. The track was written by Joji, Daniel Wilson and Justin Parker, with the production duties also completed by Parker. Joji made his American television debut when he performed the song on The Tonight Show Starring Jimmy Fallon on 2 March 2020.

Composition 
The track has been described as an atmospheric rock power ballad that features falsetto vocals and guitar solos. Other news articles described the song as R&B. The guitar portion of the song was written and performed by Jaco Caraco.

Critical reception 
Joshua Espinoza of Complex complimented Joji's artistic growth on the track, highlighting his "powerful vocals" and the "haunting, atmospheric" production. Raisa Bruner included the song on Times list of the 5 best songs of its week of release, opining that "just when you think you know what Joji has in store, he switches it up."

Charts

Certifications

References 

2020 singles
2020 songs
Joji (musician) songs
Songs written by Justin Parker
2020s ballads
Rock ballads
Songs written by Daniel Wilson (musician)
Alternative rock songs